Antigua and Barbuda is scheduled to compete at the 2023 Pan American Games in Santiago, Chile from October 20 to November 5, 2023. This will be Antigua and Barbuda's 12th appearance at the Pan American Games, having competed at every edition of the Games since 1979.

Competitors
The following is the list of number of competitors (per gender) participating at the games per sport/discipline.

Sailing

Antigua and Barbuda has qualified 1 boat for a total of 1 sailor.

Men

References

Antigua and Barbuda at the Pan American Games